Advanced Global Trading or AGT is an emissions trading and environmental consultancy firm headquartered in Dubai, United Arab Emirates and with offices in Bahrain, Doha, Zurich and Johannesburg. AGT deals in sourcing and trading of Verified Carbon Standard approved emissions trading permits (ETP), and specialised in buying and selling of emissions trading certificates and permits in the over-the-counter markets.

History 
AGT Advanced Global Trading was set up by a group of investors and business angels in 2009 with headquarters in the Dubai United Arab Emirates; Dubai was chosen for its commercial significance within the MENA region. AGT trades within the UAE and Gulf Cooperation Council regions. It later expanded into consultancy.

In August 2011 the company established a partnership with Equinox Designs to offset the environmental waste created by the exhibition industry. The estimated offset is calculated to be over 200,000 tonnes a year in the UAE alone. Lotus F1 also signed Advanced Global Trading as an official partner to reduce their environmental impact. The partnership is represented by the AGT brand, which appears on the Lotus F1 car driven by Kimi Räikkönen and Romain Grosjean.

In December 2012, the company signed an agreement with the cleaning specialist Grako in Dubai, to become the country's first carbon neutral company

Corporate social responsibility 
AGT initiated a campaign to embed  CSR strategies into the corporate governance frameworks in the Middle East. A partnership program advises corporations to negate environmental damage and to set up a self-regulating mechanism to ensure active compliance. Examples of the program are:
 AGT in June 2011 assisted Omar Samra, the first Egyptian to climb Mount Everest make his expeditions carbon neutral.
 Equinox Design division Exhibit Green to offset environmental waste and reduce their carbon footprint.
 The Swiss Le Mans race team, to enable it to become carbon neutral by retiring ETPs.
 Advanced Global Trading assisted Abu Dhabi Desert Challenge to offset any environmental damage from the March 2012 event. The agreement was between (ATCUAE) Automobile & Touring Club and AGT and was the first of its kind in GCC.
 AGT was nominated for “Best Sustainable Investment” award at the 2011 International Green Awards.
 Advanced Global Trading in May 2012 announced its official partnership with Lotus F1 to assist the team's reduction of CO2 emissions as it targets CO2 neutrality in 2012.
 AGT assists Lotus F1 with carbon neutrality for another year in 2013

References 

Alternative investment management companies
Brokerage firms
Companies based in Dubai
Financial services companies established in 2009
Consulting firms established in 2009
Macroeconomics consulting firms